The 2018 Croydon Council election took place on 3 May 2018 to elect members of Croydon Council in England. This was on the same day as other London local elections.

This election was the first fought on new ward boundaries in Croydon. The total number of seats remains the same, however the number of wards has increased by four, from 24 to 28.

Campaign
The campaign officially began on 27 March 2018.

The Conservative Party released their manifesto first, on 2 April, entitled "A Council that's on your side". The manifesto included policies such as planning committee reform, an immediate pause on the council's building company, Brick by Brick, and active Fly-Tip patrols.

The Labour manifesto was launched on 7 April, with many street stalls in district centres around the borough. The Labour manifesto was called "Labour's plan for Croydon". It heavily echoed the party's 2014 manifesto, 'Ambitious for Croydon', and largely reflected a continuation of existing council policies.

The Liberal Democrat manifesto was released shortly after, with campaigns that included a People’s Vote on Brexit, campaigning to stop the axing of local bus routes, the restoration of community policing and an extension of the night Overground to Crystal Palace.

Overall results 

†Notional changes calculated by BBC News

{| style="width:85%; text-align:center;"
|+ ↓
|- style="color:white;"
| style="background:; width:58.571%;" | 41
| style="background:; width:41.429%;" | 29
|-
| 
|

Ward Results 
An asterisk * indicates an incumbent councillor seeking re-election.

Addiscombe East

Addiscombe West

Bensham Manor

Broad Green

Coulsdon Town

Crystal Palace and Upper Norwood

Fairfield

Kenley

New Addington North

New Addington South

Norbury and Pollards Hill

Norbury Park

Old Coulsdon

Park Hill and Whitgift

Purley and Woodcote

Purley Oaks and Riddlesdown

Sanderstead

Selhurst

Selsdon and Addington Village

Selsdon Vale and Forestdale

Shirley North

Shirley South

South Croydon

South Norwood

Thornton Heath

Waddon

West Thornton

Woodside

2018-2022 by elections

References

2018 London Borough council elections
2018